The 2016 Southeastern Conference men's basketball tournament was a postseason men's basketball tournament for the Southeastern Conference held at Bridgestone Arena in Nashville, Tennessee March 9–13, 2016.

This year's tournament involved only 13 of the league's 14 teams. On January 13, 2016, Missouri, then being investigated by the NCAA for rules violations that occurred under the tenure of former head coach Frank Haith, announced that it would not participate in any postseason play this season. As a result, the #11 seed in the tournament was awarded a first-round bye, leaving the #12 seed–#13 seed game as the only game to be played on March 9.

Seeds

Schedule

Bracket

* – denotes overtime period

See also
 2016 SEC women's basketball tournament

References

2015–16 Southeastern Conference men's basketball season
SEC men's basketball tournament
SEC men's basketball tournament
Basketball competitions in Nashville, Tennessee
College sports tournaments in Tennessee